Robert Weston Dacus [DAY-cus] (born September 19, 1985) is a former American football linebacker. He was signed by the Kansas City Chiefs as an undrafted free agent in 2008. He played college football at Arkansas.

External links
Just Sports Stats
Arkansas Razorbacks bio
Kansas City Chiefs bio

1985 births
Living people
People from Searcy, Arkansas
Players of American football from Arkansas
American football linebackers
Arkansas Razorbacks football players
Kansas City Chiefs players
Florida Tuskers players